The Better Wife is a 1919 American silent drama film directed by William P. S. Earle and starring Clara Kimball Young and Edward Kimball.

Plot

Cast
 Clara Kimball Young as Charmian Page
 Edward Kimball as Mr. Page
 Nigel Barrie as Sir Richard Beverly
 Kathlyn Williams as Lady Beverly
 Ben Alexander as Little Dick
 Lillian Walker as Helen Kingdom
 Barbara Tennant as Mrs. Kingdon
 Irving Cummings as Comte de Cheveral

Preservation
With no copies of The Better Wife located in any film archives, it is a lost film.

References

External links

Films directed by William P. S. Earle
American silent feature films
American black-and-white films
Silent American drama films
1919 drama films
1919 films
Selznick Pictures films
1910s American films